Burton Christopher Bell (born February 19, 1969) is an American musician and vocalist. He is best known as the co-founder and former frontman of the metal band Fear Factory. Until 2021 he was the only member to perform on all of the band's albums. His singing style mixes clean and shouted vocals with death growls.

Career

Fear Factory

Prior to his role in Fear Factory, Bell was in the band Hateface. In 1989, after Hateface disbanded, his housemate Dino Cazares invited him to meet a drummer (Raymond Herrera) to possibly work with. On October 31, 1990, Bell, Cazares, Herrera and Romero jammed for the first time in a studio in South Los Angeles. The group recorded four studio albums before Fear Factory disbanded temporarily in 2002. The band reformed in 2004 with Christian Olde Wolbers switching from bass to guitar and Byron Stroud on bass. This line-up recorded two albums. During the following period of inactivity within the band, Cazares and Bell patched up their differences, and in 2009 decided to have Fear Factory return to form.

Bell is the only member to have appeared on every Fear Factory release from their first demo in 1991 to their tenth studio album Aggression Continuum (2021).

In 2012, Bell and Cazares received the Revolver Golden Gods Icon award.

After 31 years as the singer of Fear Factory, Bell announced on September 28, 2020 that he had left the band, citing "consistent series of dishonest representations and unfounded accusations from past and present band members" and a bitter feud between himself and Cazares. However, his vocals appear on their tenth studio album Aggression Continuum, which had been completed in 2017 but not released until 2021.

On June 16 2021, Bell performed the Fear Factory song "Replica" with a group of Australian musicians in Sydney. This happened after he'd done a DJ set at a local venue.

Ascension of the Watchers

After Fear Factory's hiatus in 2002, Bell went on to form Ascension of the Watchers with John Bechdel at Bechdel's studio in Mifflinburg, Pennsylvania. The Watchers released an online-only EP titled Iconoclast in 2005. On February 19, 2008, Ascension of the Watchers released their first full-length album Numinosum through Ministry frontman Al Jourgensen's record label 13th Planet.

In February 2017, Bell rebooted Ascension of the Watchers and began recording at Northstone Studios, South Wales, collaborating with Welsh solo artist Jayce Lewis. With Bell regarding Lewis as a Musical Soulmate, the pair recorded a new album titled Apocrypha and released it via Dissonance Productions.

Guest appearances

Bell has performed guest vocals on many records in addition to taking lead vocal duties for G/Z/R's Plastic Planet album released in 1995. Due to commitments with Fear Factory, Bell was not the vocalist for G/Z/R's second album, Black Science.  

Bell, alongside fellow bandmate, Dino Cazares, appeared on the Soulfly song "Eye for an Eye" in 1998. Bell featured as guest vocalist on the Apartment 26 song "Void", a bonus track from their debut album Hallucinating in 2000. 

Bell recorded a track for UK metal band This Is Menace; the track was then cut out of the final edit from the album No End in Sight. Bell performed live in the encore segments of the Ministry 2008 Tour, singing songs such as "Stigmata", "Thieves" and "So What", taking over vocal duties from Al Jourgensen. 

Bell joined with Byron Stroud to form City of Fire who released their debut album in August 2009.

Bell featured on Delain's 2012 album We Are the Others, providing vocals for the track "Where Is the Blood".

Bell was featured on Chris Vrenna's project Tweaker on the song "I Am the One", intended to appear on the album The Attraction to All Things Uncertain. When Vrenna reedited the album, Bell's song was cut only to be included in a DVD instead.

Bell provided backing vocals on the 20th anniversary re-recording of Pitchshifter's "Un-United Kingdom".

Bell from 2017-2018 did guest vocals on AmeriKKKant by Ministry.

Personal life
Bell has three children and is married.

Discography
All appearances are as a vocalist, unless mentioned otherwise.

References

External links

1969 births
Living people
American male singers
American heavy metal singers
American industrial musicians
Fear Factory members
GZR members
Musicians from Houston
Nu metal singers
Industrial metal musicians